Li Xiao (born Li Xiaotang on 28 July 1950) is a Chinese writer based in Shanghai. He is the son of writer Ba Jin.

Born in Shanghai, Li worked in the countryside of Anhui during the Cultural Revolution for 8 years as a sent-down youth. After the Cultural Revolution, Li attended Fudan University.

Li Xiao's 1994 novel Rules of a Clan was adapted into a 1995 film Shanghai Triad directed by Zhang Yimou.

Works translated into English

References

1950 births
20th-century Chinese novelists
Short story writers from Shanghai
Chinese male short story writers
Fudan University alumni
Sent-down youths
Living people
20th-century Chinese short story writers
People's Republic of China short story writers